Roman Kozak may refer to:

 Roman Kozak (theatre director) (1957–2010), Russian theatre actor and director
 Roman Mykolayovych Kozak (born 1957), candidate in the 2004 Ukrainian presidential election